KPRO were the call letters of a radio station in Riverside County, California.  It was at 1440 on the dial and later 1570.

The station was founded in 1941, headquartered at 3401 Russell Street, Riverside.

It went off the air on August 3, 2018. It was said to be "a victim of declining AM radio listenership and vastly increasing value of property in Southern California."

Ownership

Early
The station was founded by Willard E. (Bill) Gleeson.
In 1947 it was owned by the Broadcasting Corporation of America.

In 1950 Gleeson, the company president, was sued by the Jefferson Standard Life Insurance Company of North Carolina, which claimed that payments on loans totaling $40,000 had not been made. The company said the firm, which also owned KREO in Indio, California, was "heavily in debt" for unpaid taxes and other liabilities.

Gleeson sold all the stations he owned, except for KICO in Calexico, California.

1958 American League Rookie of the Year Albie Pearson was a disc jockey for the station in the winter of 1961–62.

On June 1, 1965, entertainer Dick Clark purchased the "San Bernardino-Riverside" station from Foster Broadcasting for $435,000. Principals were listed as Tom S. Foster, Tolbert Foster, W.E. Dyche Jr., Edgar Younger and John Blake. Dave Taylor was to continue as general manager. Clark also bought the land and buildings (built in 1941) for an additional $150,000.

The station was acquired by Shayle Ray and Milton Klein for about $2 million in March 1983.

Bankruptcy
The 1,000-watt station in Riverside was losing some $40,000 a month in 1984, and on February 29 of that year the 15-person staff had not been paid in two weeks. The owners, Milton Klein and Shayle Ray, were trying to negotiate a sale of KPRO and its sisters, KPRD-AM and KZNS-FM of Barstow, California.

KZNS and KPRD left the airwaves in early March after more than 30 years of broadcasting, but KPRO was saved at the last minute by an unidentified San Bernardino businessman who bought into the partnership with enough cash to pay the employees and stay on the air. KPRO's Arbitron ratings were about one percent of all listeners in its market.

Regular programming at the station, which had gone into bankruptcy, went off the air on May 15, 1984. It listed $2.5 million of debt. It continued to broadcast California Angels baseball and Los Angeles Lakers basketball games to fulfill contractual obligations, and it went back on the air with other programing in mid-June, then in February again went on a sports-only schedule,
with Pat Hasland hosting a call-in show, "Pro SportsTalk."

Final licensees
Ray and Helen Lapica, with Ollie Shervan, owned KACE, which changed its name to KHNY in 1976 and KMAY in 1978. They were followed as owners by Ronnie Olenick and Larry Lapica.

In 1986, that company (under the name Riverside County Broadcasting) took over the KPRO call sign, which had been abandoned, and moved it to 1570 on the dial.

In 1990 it was said that KPRO was "Established in 1941" and billed itself as "inspirational radio," with live gospel on Sundays.

In 2018 the station was owned by Impact Radio, Inc., and featured programming from CNN Radio and Westwood One.

The station went off the air on August 3, 2018. The property was sold to a land developer. The Federal Communications Commission cancelled KPRO's license on November 5, 2019, due to it having been silent for more than twelve months.

Formats
In 1944 the station received Blue Network programming.

In 1945 KPRO's programs included Philco Hall of Fame, America's Town Meeting, Counterspy, Gangbusters, This Is Your F.B.I., Walter Winchell, Drew Pearson, Tom Breneman, The Breakfast Club, Glamour Manor, Ladies Be Seated, John B. Kennedy, Baukhage Talking, Ethel and Albert, Guy Lombardo, The Metropolitan Opera, Cavalcade of Sports and The Ford Sunday Evening Hour.

The station had a news and talk show format in 1983 and 1985. Before that it had a pop music format.

After 1986 it specialized in religious programming.

Notable employees
 Steve Julian
 Larry Mantle

References

Further reading
 Willard R. Hillary, "Cathedral City," The Desert Sun of Palm Springs, California, September 19, 1941
 "High School Debaters Will Attend Tourney," San Bernardino Daily Sun, November 13, 1941, page 10
 "Staff of High School Newspaper Enlarged," San Bernardino Sun, February 3, 1942, page 7
 "Rambling Through the Studios of KPRO," advertisement, San Bernardino Daily Sun, April 7, 1944, page 6

External links
FCC Station Search Details: DKPRO (Facility ID: 50281)
History Cards for KPRO (covering 1955-1978 as KAMP / KACE / KHNY / KMAY)

PRO
Radio stations established in 1958
Mass media in Riverside, California
Mass media in San Bernardino, California
1958 establishments in California
Defunct radio stations in the United States
Radio stations disestablished in 2019
2019 disestablishments in California
Defunct religious radio stations in the United States
PRO